The Dirtwater Dynasty is a five-part Australian drama miniseries, first screened on Network Ten in 1988. It was directed by Michael Jenkins and John Power.

Cast
 Hugo Weaving as Richard Eastwick
 Victoria Longley as Kate Eastwick (née McBride), Nancy Westaway (née Eastwick), Sarah Westaway
 Steve Jacobs as Josh McCall
 Judy Morris as Frances Eastwick
 Bruce Spence as Lonely Logan
 Dennis Miller as Hasky Tarbox
 Harold Hopkins as Rev. McBride
 Jenny Lee as Mrs. McBride
 Kristina Nehm as Esmerelda
 Peter Phelps as David Eastwick
 Scott Burgess as Guy Westaway
 Robert Menzies as Richie Eastwick
Ned Manning as David Eastwick II
 Anne-Louise Lambert as Emma Tarbox
 Arna-Maria Winchester as Mrs. Tarbox
 Leverne McDonnell as Christine Eastwick
 Ernie Dingo as Billy (Senior)
 Vincent Ball as Eastwick Banker
 Damien Connor as Stockman
 Daryl Dicks as Hughie, Stockman
 John Livingstone as Stockman
 Kristen Mann as Stockman
 Gary Sargeant as Juggler
 Hayden Topperwien as Young Richard Eastwick
 Iain Williams as Stockman #2
 Mouche Phillips as Mary Eastwick

Reception

The miniseries rated well earning 33 points.

See also
 List of Australian television series

References

External links

The Dirtwater Dynasty at the National Film and Sound Archive
The Dirtwater Dynasty at Australian Screen Online

1988 films
1988 drama films
Australian drama films
Australian drama television series
1980s Australian television miniseries
Network 10 original programming
1988 Australian television series debuts
1988 Australian television series endings
Films produced by Doug Mitchell
Films directed by John Power
Films directed by Michael Jenkins
1980s Australian films